Marianne Brandis (born October 5, 1938) is a Dutch-born Canadian writer.

Brandis came to Canada with her family in 1947. Her family lived in British Columbia and Nova Scotia before settling in Ontario. She received a BA and MA from McMaster University. She worked as a copywriter for various private radio stations and for the Canadian Broadcasting Corporation. Brandis also taught English at Ryerson Polytechnical Institute (now Toronto Metropolitan University). She has been a full-time writer since 1989. She currently lives in Stratford, Ontario.

Selected works 
 The Tinderbox (1982)
 The Quarter-Pie Window (1985), received the Canadian Library Association Young Adult Book Award and the IODE Violet Downey Book Award
 The Sign of the Scales (1990), received the Geoffrey Bilson Award
 Fire Ship (1992), received a Commendation from the Toronto Historical Board
 Rebellion: A Novel of Upper Canada, historical novel for young adults (1996), received the Geoffrey Bilson Award and the Award of Merit from Heritage Toronto
 Frontiers and Sanctuaries: A Woman's Life in Holland and Canada, biography (2006)
 The Grand River / Dundalk to Lake Erie (2015)

References

External links 
 

1938 births
Living people
Canadian writers of young adult literature
Writers from Ontario
McMaster University alumni